Forest Grove School may refer to:

Canada
 École Forest Grove School of Forest Grove, Saskatoon, a part of Saskatoon Public Schools

United States
 Forest Grove School of the Forest Grove School District (Oklahoma)
 Forest Grove High School in Oregon
Forest Grove School No. 5, a school building in rural Scott County, Iowa, listed on the NRHP